Chronographos (Greek: Χρονογραφος) is among the oldest newspapers in Greece. It operates as a local newspaper distributed in Piraeus, one of the largest municipalities of Greece. As a paper, it tends to be fairly politically central and is published on a daily basis. Chronographos affiliates with other major newspapers in Greece and controls Piraiko Vima and several local magazines.

Newspapers published in Piraeus
Publications with year of establishment missing
Daily newspapers published in Greece